Three United States Navy ships have been named USS Quincy, after the city of Quincy, Massachusetts.

  was a German cargo ship seized during World War I.
  was a heavy cruiser, sunk during World War II.
  was a heavy cruiser, named to commemorate CA-39.

United States Navy ship names